The Total Carbon Column Observing Network (TCCON) is a global network of instruments that measure the amount of carbon dioxide, methane, carbon monoxide, nitrous oxide and other trace gases in the Earth's atmosphere. The TCCON began in 2004 with the installation of the first instrument in Park Falls, Wisconsin, USA, and has since grown to 23 operational instruments worldwide, with 7 former sites.

The TCCON is designed to investigate several things, including the flow (or flux) of carbon between the atmosphere, land, and ocean (the so-called carbon budget or carbon cycle). This is achieved by measuring the atmospheric mass of carbon (the airborne fraction). The TCCON measurements have improved the scientific community's understanding of the carbon cycle, and urban greenhouse gas emissions.

The TCCON supports several satellite instruments by providing an independent measurement to compare (or validate) the satellite measurements of the atmosphere over the TCCON site locations. The TCCON provides the primary measurement validation dataset for the Orbiting Carbon Observatory (OCO-2) mission, and has been used to validate other space-based measurements of carbon dioxide.

History
The TCCON was established partly because of modeling errors between mixing efficiency between the PBL and the free troposphere. Because TCCON measurements are of the entire column of atmosphere above a site (PBL and free troposphere are simultaneously measured) the measurements are an improvement over the traditional in situ near surface measurements in this regard. TCCON has improved the CO2 mass gradient measurements between the northern and southern hemispheres.

The first annual TCCON meeting was in San Francisco, California in 2005. Every year a meeting is held in a location that rotates between North America, the Western Pacific, and Europe hosted by a participating institution. In 2015 the meeting was held at the University of Toronto.

Measurement technique
The main instrument at each TCCON site is a Bruker IFS 125HR (HR for high resolution, ~0.02 cm−1) or occasionally 120HR Fourier transform spectrometer. Sunlight is directed into the spectrometer by solar tracking mirrors and other optics. The spectrometers measure the absorption of direct sunlight by atmospheric trace gases primarily in the near infrared region. This remote sensing technique produces a precise and accurate measurement of the total column abundance of the trace gas. The main limitation to this technique is that measurements can not be recorded when it is not sunny (i.e. there are no measurements available at nighttime or when there is heavy cloud cover).

Participating sites and Institutions
Current TCCON sites are located in the United States, China, Canada, Germany, Poland, France, Japan, Australia, New Zealand, South Korea, Réunion, and Ascension Island. A former site was in Brazil. Sites can change when an instrument needs to be moved to a new location.

TCCON members collaborate from a variety of different institutions. In North America some of these include Caltech, JPL, Los Alamos National Laboratory, NASA Ames, and the University of Toronto.  In Europe some of these include Karlsruhe Institute of Technology, Max Planck Institute for Biogeochemistry, University of Bremen, Agencia Estatal de Meteorología, Royal Belgian Institute for Space Aeronomy, Finnish Meteorological Institute, and Pierre and Marie Curie University. In the western Pacific some of these include University of Wollongong, National Institute of Water and Atmospheric Research, National Institute for Environmental Studies, JAXA, and National Institute of Meteorological Research of the Republic of Korea.

New sites are admitted into the network when site investigators demonstrate required hardware, and data processing ability. Uniformity is maintained across the network by using the same FTS model and the same retrieval software. GGG is the software of the TCCON. It includes the I2S (interferogram to spectrum) FFT, and GFIT spectral fitting subroutines. GFIT is also the fitting algorithm that was used for ATMOS which flew on the Space Shuttle, and is used for spectral fitting of spectra obtained by a balloon borne spectrometer.

Map

Highlights of Data Use
Data from each site is processed by the investigators that head that particular site. Atmospheric abundances of gases are uploaded and saved in uniform formats and data are hosted at Caltech with the Caltech Library and are available from http://tccondata.org. Data are made publicly available provided the data license is followed.

Data have been used for a variety of analyses. Some of these include
 Emission estimates of methane and carbon monoxide were made for the South Coast Air Basin containing Los Angeles using TCCON measurements and the CARB inventory.
 Characterization of biosphere fluxes in the Southern Hemisphere 
 Evaluation of the seasonal exchange of CO2 between the biosphere and the atmosphere 
 Numerous satellite validation projects 
 Validation projects involving comparison of CO2 and CH4 measured by TCCON with that measured by lower-resolution instruments
 Covariation between surface temperature and CO2 in boreal regions
 Distinguishing between which of two power plants (~2000 MW each) plumes of polluted air came from in conjunction with a Pandora NO2 spectrometer

Satellite support
The satellite missions supported by the TCCON include the Greenhouse Gases Observing Satellite (GOSAT), SCIAMACHY, and the Orbiting Carbon Observatory-2 (OCO-2).

See also
 The TCCON home page: https://tccon-wiki.caltech.edu
 Orbiting Carbon Observatory 2
 Greenhouse Gases Observing Satellite
 Founding member Paul Wennberg

References

External links

Atmospheric sciences